Richard Davies (c.1777–1859) was a Welsh Anglican priest in the 19th century.

Davies was born in Brecknockshire and educated at Christ Church, Oxford. He was Archdeacon of Brecon from 1805 to 1859.

References

Archdeacons of Brecon
19th-century Welsh Anglican priests
Alumni of Worcester College, Oxford
People from Brecknockshire
Year of birth uncertain
1859 deaths